West St. John High School is a senior high school in Edgard, an unincorporated area in St. John the Baptist Parish, Louisiana. It is a part of the St. John the Baptist Parish School Board and serves grades 8–12.

The school has fewer than 200 students. The student body is 99 percent African-American.

History
West St. John was originally named Second Ward High School before changing to its current name. 

There was a previous Second Ward High School also located in Edgard that served black students from 1950 to 1969.

Athletics
West St. John High athletics competes in the LHSAA.

State Championships
West St. John
(4) Football: 1998, 2003, 2004, 2017

Second Ward
(2) Football: 1971, 1972

Notable alumni
Tyson Jackson, NFL defensive lineman
Quinn Johnson, NFL fullback
Juan Joseph, CFL quarterback 
Terry Robiskie, NFL player and coach (Second Ward High School)
Farrah Rochon, Romance novel writer

References

External links
 West St. John High School website

Public high schools in Louisiana
Schools in St. John the Baptist Parish, Louisiana